Issia Department is a department of Haut-Sassandra Region in Sassandra-Marahoué District, Ivory Coast. In 2021, its population was 410,628 and its seat is the settlement of Issia. The sub-prefectures of the department are Boguédia, Iboguhé, Issia, Nahio, Namané, Saïoua, and Tapéguia.

History
Issia Department was created in 1980 as first-level subdivision via a split-off from Daloa Department. In 1997, regions were introduced as new first-level subdivisions of Ivory Coast; as a result, all departments were converted into second-level subdivisions. Issia Department was included in Haut-Sassandra Region.

In 2011, districts were introduced as new first-level subdivisions of Ivory Coast. At the same time, regions were reorganised and became second-level subdivisions and all departments were converted into third-level subdivisions. At this time, Issia Department remained part of the retained Haut-Sassandra Region in the new Sassandra-Marahoué District.

Notes

Departments of Haut-Sassandra
1980 establishments in Ivory Coast
States and territories established in 1980